Muhammad Tahir Rai, Hilal-i-Shujaat is a Pakistani civil servant and a Police officer who is currently serving as  National Coordinator, National Counter Terrorism Authority (NACTA) Since 29 July 2022. He has also served as Inspector General of Balochistan Police & Director General Federal Investigation Agency .

References

Living people
Pakistani police officers
Inspector Generals of Balochistan Police
Year of birth missing (living people)